Kyrgyzstan competed at the 2017 Asian Indoor and Martial Arts Games held in Ashgabat, Turkmenistan from September 17 to 27. 158 athletes competed in 16 different sports.

Participants

Medallists

References

Nations at the 2017 Asian Indoor and Martial Arts Games
2017 in Kyrgyzstani sport
2017